Yuan Yuan (born Yuan Chengyi on 31 July 1953) is a Chinese actor, director and producer.

Filmography

Film

TV dramas

References

External links

1953 births
Living people
20th-century Chinese male actors
21st-century Chinese male actors
Chinese male film actors
Chinese male television actors
Male actors from Beijing